Joachim Hopp (born 10 July 1966) is a German former professional footballer who played as a defender.

References

1966 births
Living people
Association football defenders
German footballers
MSV Duisburg II players
MSV Duisburg players
Rot-Weiß Oberhausen players
KFC Uerdingen 05 players
Bundesliga players
2. Bundesliga players
German football managers
Footballers from Duisburg